Ikamauius is an extinct genus of sawshark from the Cenozoic of New Zealand. It contains a single species, I. ensifer. It is most closely related to the extant Pliotrema, but is distinguished by the presence of barbs on both sides of its rostral denticles.

References

Fish of New Zealand
Pristiophoridae
Prehistoric cartilaginous fish genera